The Thirteenth Saeima of Latvia was elected in the 2018 Latvian parliamentary election held on 6 October 2018. The Saeima's term commenced on 6 November 2018 and will end on 1 November 2022.

Elections 

The 100 members of the Saeima are elected by open list proportional representation from five multi-member constituencies (Kurzeme, Latgale, Riga (in which overseas votes are counted), Vidzeme and Zemgale) between 12 and 35 seats in size. Seats are allocated using the Sainte-Laguë method with a national electoral threshold of 5%.

Composition

Parliamentary groups 

After the elections, the parliamentary groups were formed in the Saeima on the party lines, with the exception of MP Julija Stepanenko, who was elected from the Harmony list but didn't join the party's parliamentary group.

Members 

123 members have served in the Thirteenth Saeima.

References 

2018 in Latvia
Saeima
Political history of Latvia